Arsenis is a surname. Notable people with the surname include:

Gerasimos Arsenis (1931–2016), Greek politician
Kriton Arsenis (born 1977), Greek environmentalist and politician

See also
Arsenio

Greek-language surnames